Joseph Hanse (1902–1992) was a Belgian linguist.

1902 births
1992 deaths
Catholic University of Leuven (1834–1968) alumni
Linguists from Belgium
Walloon people
20th-century linguists